YDS or yds may refer to:
YDS (Language Proficiency Test administered in Turkey)
Yards
YDS algorithm in computer science
Yosemite Decimal System
Young Democratic Socialists, US
Yiddish Sign Language's ISO 639 code.